Ralph Bronson Cowan (May 6, 1902 – April 21, 1990) was a Canadian politician, who represented York—Humber in the House of Commons of Canada from 1962 to 1968.

Federal political career
Born in Ottawa, Ontario, Ralph Cowan was first elected to the House of Commons of Canada in the 1962 election, defeating Margaret Aitken. A Liberal, he was re-elected in 1963 and 1965. In 1964, he filed a lawsuit against the Canadian Broadcasting Corporation after it converted its secondary Toronto station CJBC to an affiliate of the francophone Radio-Canada network, arguing that since the French language had no legal status outside of Quebec, the station's conversion to French was inappropriate and illegal; however, his case was dismissed by the Ontario Supreme Court in 1965 on the grounds that Cowan did not have legal standing and could not show material harm from the format change.

Although a Liberal, Cowan was considered a renegade and often voted against his own caucus; most notably, he filibustered both Lawrence Pennell's 1967 bill to abolish capital punishment in Canada and the 1968 Broadcasting Act, and opposed Justice Minister Pierre Trudeau's 1968 revisions to the Criminal Code, including the decriminalization of homosexuality and abortion. He was expelled from the Liberal Party caucus in March 1968 after voting against the government's tax bill, but fought to retain his rights as a voting party member at the 1968 Liberal Party of Canada leadership convention, and pledged that he would continue to support the government if it faced a motion of non-confidence.

He ran in the 1968 federal election as an Independent Liberal in High Park after being expelled from caucus, and distributed pamphlets published by far right activist Ron Gostick alleging that Trudeau was a communist sympathizer as part of his campaign, but was defeated by Liberal candidate Walter Deakon.

Municipal politics
Following his federal defeat, Cowan attempted to intervene in the 1969 election for Metro Toronto Chairman, alleging in a speech made days before the election that the York mayor John Lister (Jack) Mould had a personal financial interest in a construction company whose tax arrears had been written off by York's municipal council. Mould was forced out of the contest when, at the last minute, two Metro Councillors who had agreed to nominate him decided to nominate another candidate instead as they decided not to nominate Mould "in view of developments in York".  Mould filed a slander lawsuit against Cowan days after he made the allegation, but the suit never went to court and Cowan later claimed that it had been filed solely to silence him.

Following the death of York municipal councillor Robert Hewitt in 1971, Cowan applied for appointment to the seat; he was not appointed, with council instead selecting Robert Waclawski.

Electoral record

|-
  
|Liberal
|Ralph Cowan
|align="right"|15,526
  
|Progressive Conservative
|Margaret Aitken 
|align="right"| 14,864 
 
|New Democratic Party
|Charles Millard
|align="right"| 11,622

|}

|-
  
|Liberal
|Ralph Cowan
|align="right"|20,188    
  
|Progressive Conservative
|Douglas Morton
|align="right"|12,218
 
|New Democratic Party
|Charles Millard
|align="right"|11,821   
|}

|-
  
|Liberal
|Ralph Cowan
|align="right"| 17,172   
 
|New Democratic Party
|Don Stevenson
|align="right"|12,792   
  
|Progressive Conservative
|Victor Colebourn
|align="right"|11,325 
 
|New Capitalist Party
|D. C. Tilley
|align="right"|235
|}

|}

References

External links
 

1902 births
1990 deaths
Liberal Party of Canada MPs
Members of the House of Commons of Canada from Ontario
Politicians from Ottawa
Politicians from Toronto